Sergio Juan Ramírez Rosaldo (born July 31, 1979) is a Mexican football manager and former player.

References

1979 births
Living people
Mexican footballers
Mexican expatriate footballers
Association football goalkeepers
San Luis F.C. players
Altamira F.C. players
Ulisses FC players
FC Ararat Yerevan players
Liga MX players
Expatriate footballers in Armenia
Mexican expatriate sportspeople in Armenia
Footballers from Veracruz
People from Coatzacoalcos